Ebenezer Jackson Jr. (January 31, 1796 – August 17, 1874) was a U.S. Representative from Connecticut.

Born in Savannah, Georgia, Jackson pursued academic studies.
He was graduated from St. Mary's College (now known as Mount St. Mary's), near Baltimore, Maryland, in 1814.
He studied law at the Litchfield Law School, Connecticut.
He was admitted to the bar and commenced practice in Philadelphia, Pennsylvania, in 1821.
He moved to Middletown, Connecticut, in 1826.
He served as a member of the State house of representatives 1829-1832.

Jackson was elected as an Anti-Jacksonian candidate to the Twenty-third Congress to fill the vacancy caused by the resignation of Samuel A. Foote and served from December 1, 1834, to March 3, 1835.
He was an unsuccessful candidate for reelection in 1834 to the Twenty-fourth Congress.
He was again a member of the State house of representatives in 1849.
He died in Middletown, Connecticut, August 17, 1874 and is interred in Indian Hill Cemetery.

References

1796 births
1874 deaths
Burials at Indian Hill Cemetery
19th-century American politicians
National Republican Party members of the United States House of Representatives from Connecticut
Members of the Connecticut House of Representatives